Bucculatrix montana is a moth in the family Bucculatricidae. It was described by Annette Frances Braun in 1920 and is found in North America, where it has been recorded from Ontario, Nova Scotia, Indiana, Maryland, Virginia, Ohio, Michigan, Maine, New York, New Jersey, Massachusetts and Georgia.

The wingspan is 10.5–13 mm. The forewings are white, marked with ocherous, more or less fuscous dusted, or sometimes with dark fuscous. The hindwings are pale fuscous. Adults are on wing from June to August.

References

Natural History Museum Lepidoptera generic names catalog

Bucculatricidae
Moths described in 1920
Moths of North America
Taxa named by Annette Frances Braun